Antonio Vega (18 September 1932 – 15 August 2011) was a Spanish sports shooter. He competed in the trap event at the 1952 Summer Olympics.

References

External links
 

1932 births
2011 deaths
Spanish male sport shooters
Olympic shooters of Spain
Shooters at the 1952 Summer Olympics
Sportspeople from San Sebastián
20th-century Spanish people